Teresa d'Entença (c. 1300 – 20 October 1327) was the eldest daughter of Gombau d'Entença and his wife Constança d'Antillón. She was Countess of Urgell in her own right; however, control over her estate passed to her husband, Alfonso IV of Aragon.

Biography
Before dying childless at La Llitera, Teresa's granduncle Ermengol X of Urgell agreed to make Alfonso heir to the County of Urgell, on the condition that Alfonso marry Teresa, who was his rightful heir. Alfonso agreed to this and he married Teresa in 1314 in the Cathedral of Lerida. Alfonso is reputed to have been so liberal in the expenses during the wedding, that the local counsels imposed restrictions on how much he could spend. 

Teresa died whilst giving birth to her son Sancho on 20 October 1327 at Zaragoza, only days before her husband became king of Aragon. She is buried at Zaragoza Franciscan Church. Her younger son James inherited Urgell.

Issue
Alfonso and Teresa were married for thirteen years, and had seven children:

 Alfonso (1315–1317)
 Constance (1318–1346), married in 1336 to James III of Majorca.
 Peter IV (1319–1387), successor.
 James I, Count of Urgell (1321–1347), also inherited Entença and Antillon.
 Isabella (1323–1327).
 Fadrique (1325-died young).
 Sancho (1327), lived only a few days.

See also
House of Entença

Ancestry

References

Sources

 

1300 births
1327 deaths
Deaths in childbirth
House of Aragon
Counts of Urgell
Aragonese queen consorts
Countesses of Barcelona
14th-century Catalan people
14th-century Spanish women